Richard Williams (born 11 June 1977) is a British motor racing driver who competed in the Porsche Mobil 1 Supercup as a member of the SPS Automotive Performance Team.

Williams was born in Yeovil, Somerset. He entered motor sport through karting before moving to cars. After coming 4th overall with a single race win the Renault Clio Cup in 2004, he entered the 2005 BTCC in a Lexus, ran by SpeedEquipe and sponsored by Friends Reunited and HPI Racing. He came 14th overall in a small field, with a best result of 7th . In 2006 he contested the Porsche Carrera Cup, with a best result of 3rd, also entering the Supercup round at Silverstone as a wild card of sorts. For 2007 he is contesting the British GT Championship

Racing record

Complete British Touring Car Championship results
(key) (Races in bold indicate pole position – 1 point awarded just in first race) (Races in italics indicate fastest lap – 1 point awarded all races) (* signifies that driver lead race for at least one lap – 1 point awarded all races)

Complete Porsche Supercup results
(key) (Races in bold indicate pole position – 2 points awarded 2008 onwards in all races) (Races in italics indicate fastest lap)

† Not eligible for points.

Complete British GT results
(key) (Races in bold indicate pole position) (Races in italics indicate fastest lap)

British Touring Car Championship drivers
English racing drivers
1977 births
Living people
British GT Championship drivers
People from Yeovil
Porsche Supercup drivers
24 Hours of Spa drivers
Porsche Carrera Cup GB drivers
Renault UK Clio Cup drivers